The Disability Visibility Project (DVP) is an online community dedicated to creating, recording, sharing, and amplifying disability media, stories, and culture. DVP is a community partnership with StoryCorps, an American oral history organization dedicated to preserving and sharing stories through interviews. Interviews recorded with StoryCorps are archived at the American Folklife Center at the Library of Congress with the permission of the interviewer. The DVP platform consists mainly of blog posts and podcast episodes, but also creates disabled media from collected oral histories in the form of tweets, radio stories, audio clips, images, etc.

History 
The Disability Visibility Project was founded by the disability activist Alice Wong in 2014, who remains the sole creator and director of the project. There are around 61 million people living with disabilities in America, most of who are never represented in mainstream media. The Disability Visibility Project was founded in order to create a body of history and knowledge about the lives and experiences of those who are disabled. It was created to preserve the experiences of this unrepresented group.
  
The project was originally a year-long campaign that would end in 2015 to celebrate 25 years since the Americans with Disabilities Act of 1990 (ADA) was passed. Despite the law requiring specific parking spaces and ramps for disabled people, Wong believed that these efforts did not actually protect the disabled community. Wong remained critical of the ADA's progress and achievements, especially concerning disparities in healthcare, education, and economic security, limiting the ability to fully participate in every aspect of society. DVP was launched a way for the disabled community to take back control of their narrative and dismantle the idea that living with a disability is either pitiful or inspirational. Because Wong believed that the disabled community was missing a documented history, she worked with StoryCorps to create the DVP and raise awareness of everyday people living with physical, mental, and/or learning disabilities.

Project aims 
The Disability Visibility Project works with StoryCorps to encourage and allow disabled people to record their own oral histories and to share their lived experiences of disability.

The aim of the DVP is to create intersectional, multi-modal, and accessible disabled media. The platform serves as a space for disabled people and people with disabilities to make their voices heard. Participants who share their interviews and stories contribute to an archive of powerful stories that are available to future generations.

Wong believes that people in the disabled community have a lot to teach and share, from experiences regarding their disability to things beyond perceived limitations. DVP aims to showcase stories that say disabled people should be valued as people.

Archive 
The Disability Visibility Project is an ongoing effort. The podcast, launched in 2017, includes over 80 episodes, each with an open and honest reflection of the experiences of the disability community. Topics range from video games, climate change, poetry, immigration, intersectionality, design, violence, mental health, to entrepreneurship.

A list of all DVP Interviews can be found on their website. Interviews are organized alphabetically by the interviewee's last name. Each interview page features an edited audio clip, image description, and text transcript produced by the DVP team. The collection of interviews serves as an archive of disability culture and history.

The DVP blog publishes reports, news, blog posts, Q&A posts, and original essays written by Wong, guest writers, and people with disabilities who are engaged with culture at every level. Topics include ableism, intersectionality, culture, media, and politics from the perspective of disabled people.

Copies of oral history interviews are archived at the American Folklife Center at the Library of Congress if given permission by the interviewer.

References

External links 

 Official website

Disability organizations based in the United States
Disability culture